FC Vybor-Kurbatovo Voronezh is a Russian football team based in Voronezh. It was founded in 1997. In 2014–15 season, it advanced to the professional level, the third-tier Russian Professional Football League. The team withdrew from professional competition in the PFL on 13 March 2015 due to lack of financing.

External links
  Official site

Association football clubs established in 1997
Football clubs in Russia
Sport in Voronezh